Caffarelli may be
Caffarelli (castrato), stage name of the castrato Gaetano Majorano (1710-1783)
Carmela Cafarelli (1889-1979) was proprietor of Cleveland Ohio's Cafarelli Opera Company
Luis Caffarelli (born 1948), American-Argentine mathematician
A family of French church and military leaders, all of them brothers:
Louis-Marie-Joseph Maximilian Caffarelli du Falga (1756-1799), general
Charles Ambroise de Caffarelli du Falga (1758-1826), canon and prefect
Louis Marie Joseph Caffarelli (1760-1845), the first préfet maritime de Brest
Jean-Baptiste de Caffarelli du Falga (1763-1815), bishop of Saint-Brieuc
Marie-François Auguste de Caffarelli du Falga (1766-1849), general
. 

Surnames
Italian-language surnames